Portrait of a Man is a 1663 oil on canvas painting by Ferdinand Bol, now in the Rijksmuseum in Amsterdam.

It shows a man with long blonde hair in a banyan against a background of architectural columns and a statue of Apollo. Its subject is unknown but may be Jacob van Campen, one of the most important proponents of Dutch classicism, Artus Quellinus, a sculptor who produced works for the stadhuis op de Dam and other buildings designed by Van Campen, or Louis Trip, who with his brother Hendrick designed the Trippenhuis, for which Bol painted a number of paintings.

Frame

Bibliography
Anoniem (1830) Aanwijzing der schilderijen, berustende op ’s Rijks Museum, te Amsterdam, [s.l.: s.n.], p. 11, cat.nr. 36 (als ‘Het portret van Jacob van Campen, bouwheer van het stadhuis, tegenwoordig het koninklijk paleis te Amsterdam’). Zie Google Boeken.
Anoniem (1839) Aanwijzing der schilderijen, berustende op ’s Rijks Museum te Amsterdam, [s.l.: s,n,], p. 9, cat.nr. 36, als ‘Portret van Jacob van Kampen, bouwheer van het stadhuis (tegenwoordig het Koninklijk paleis) te Amsterdam’). Zie Google Boeken.
Anoniem (1903) Catalogus der Schilderijen miniaturen, pastels, omlijste teekeningen, enz. in het Rijks-Museum te Amsterdam, Amsterdam: Boek- en kunstdrukkerij v/h Roeloffzen-Hübner en Van Santen, p. 54, cat.nr. 545 (als Artus Quellinus). Zie archive.org.
anoniem (1934) Catalogus der schilderijen pastels–miniaturen–aquarellen tentoongesteld in het Rijksmuseum te Amsterdam, Amsterdam: J.H. de Bussy, p. 52, cat.nr. 545 (also Artus Quellinus). Zie delpher.nl.

Exhibition history
De gouden eeuw der grote steden, Sint-Pietersabdij, Gent, 14 June-14 September 1958.
The Golden Age. Highlights from the Rijksmuseum, National Gallery of Victoria, Melbourne, 24 June-2 October 2005, Hyogo Prefectural Museum of Art, Kobe, 25 October 2005-15 January 2006.
Rembrandt and the Golden Age. Highlights from the Rijksmuseum, Amsterdam, Shanghai Museum, Shanghai, 2 November 2007-13 February 2008, cat.nr. 54.
Vermeer, Rembrandt and the Golden Age of Dutch painting. Masterpieces from the Rijksmuseum, Vancouver Art Gallery, Vancouver, 9 May-13 September 2009, .
L'âge d'or hollandais. De Rembrandt à Vermeer, Pinacothèque de Paris, Paris, 7 October 2009-7 February 2010, p. 226-227, cat.nr. 91.

References

Man
Paintings in the collection of the Rijksmuseum
1663 paintings
Portraits of men